The 2012 Hawaiian Islands Invitational was an inter-confederation association football tournament contested in February at Aloha Stadium, Hawaii between 4 different clubs from the United States, Japan, South Korea, and Australia. It is considered to be the successor to the now-defunct Pan-Pacific Championship.

Teams
The 4 teams  accepted the invitation and contested the tournament were:
  Colorado Rapids – MLS 
  Melbourne Heart FC Youth Team – A-League
  Yokohama FC – J. League division 2
  Busan IPark – K-League

Matches

Semifinal Round

Championship Round

Consolation Match

Championship Match

Venue

The venue for the Hawaiian Islands Invitational, is Aloha Stadium is a 50,000 seat, multi-use stadium in Honolulu, Hawaii. It has an artificial, FieldTurf surface which replaced the original AstroTurf in 2003. It is currently hosts to the Hawaii Warriors in the NCAA, and has played host to the Hawai'i Bowl since 2002. It was also the venue for the inaugural Pan-Pacific Championship in 2008.

Table

References

External links
 Hawaiian Islands Invitational Website

2012 in American soccer
2012 in Australian soccer
2012 in Asian football
American soccer friendly trophies
Soccer in Hawaii
2012 in sports in Hawaii
International association football competitions hosted by the United States